Undertow is a 1996 American TV thriller film directed by Eric Red.

Plot 
A man's car breaks down and he seeks shelter in a remote shack in the woods, where he is held at gunpoint by a deranged mountain man.

Cast 
 Lou Diamond Phillips as Jack Ketchum
 Mia Sara as Willie Yates
 Charles Dance as Lyle Yates

Reception 
TVGuide.com rated it 2 out of 5 stars. Carole Horst of Variety.com wrote that it "drowns in a fuzzy script and amateurish direction that fail to build tension or sympathy for the leads."

References

External links 
 

1996 action thriller films
1996 films
1996 drama films
1996 television films
Films directed by Eric Red
American thriller television films
American drama television films
Action television films
Films scored by John Frizzell (composer)
1990s American films